Japanese singer-songwriter Ayumi Hamasaki has won numerous awards, including 23 Japan Gold Disc Awards, 8 Japan Record Awards, 3 MTV Video Music Awards Japan and two MTV Asia Awards.



Awards and nominations

References

External links
 The official online collection of all of Hamasaki's music videos (also includes making-of videos and commercials)
 Ayumi Hamasaki's official English-language website
 TeamAyu (official fansite)

Awards
Hamasaki, Ayumi